Marco Di Benedetto (born 5 August 1995) is an Italian footballer who plays as a midfielder for Civitanovese.

Club career

Pescara
Di Benedetto started his career at Abruzzese club Pescara.

Juventus
On 17 August 2011 Di Benedetto was signed by Juventus for €450,000, rejoining former Pescara team-mate Luca Del Papa. Di Benedetto only played 8 times for the reserve team in the 2012–13 season. Di Benedetto signed his first professional contract in 2013, keeping him until 2016. Di Benedetto played twice in 2013–14 UEFA Youth League.

FeralpiSalò (loan)
On 31 January 2014 Di Benedetto was farmed to Lega Pro Prima Divisione club FeralpiSalò. On 17 July 2014 the loan was renewed, which the club also signed fellow midfielder Michele Cavion from Turin.

Lanciano
On 8 July 2015 Serie B club Lanciano signed Di Benedetto and Penna from Juventus, as part of the deal that Mame Baba Thiam moved to Turin outright in June.

Later career
After four months at L'Aquila, Di Benedetto joined Polisportiva Torrese 1974 in December 2019. On 12 August 2020, he moved to Nereto Calcio. On 8 April 2021, Di Benedetto signed with Lanciano. In July 2021, he joined ASD Sambuceto Calcio.

In December 2021, Di Benedetto moved to Civitanovese Calcio.

International career
Di Benedetto played six friendlies for Italy national youth teams. However, he was not selected to 2012 UEFA European Under-17 Championship qualification.

References

External links
 

1995 births
Living people
Italian footballers
Serie C players
Serie D players
Italy youth international footballers
Association football midfielders
Delfino Pescara 1936 players
Juventus F.C. players
FeralpiSalò players
S.S. Virtus Lanciano 1924 players
Forlì F.C. players
L'Aquila Calcio 1927 players
Civitanovese Calcio players